Fogelson is a surname. Notable people with the surname include:

Buddy Fogelson (1900–1987), American lawyer and businessman
Gerald Fogelson (born 1933), American real estate developer and author
Jeff Fogelson (1947–2018), American athlete director
Raymond D. Fogelson (1933–2020), American anthropologist